The Shadow of the Eagle (a.k.a. Shadow of the Eagle) is a 1932 American Pre-Code Mascot 12 episode film serial, directed by Ford Beebe and B. Reeves Eason and produced by Nat Levine. The film stars John Wayne in his first serial role. He would go on to star in two other serials for Mascot, The Hurricane Express (1932) and The Three Musketeers (1933). The Shadow of the Eagle is now in the public domain.

Plot
Colonel Nathan B. "Skipper" Gregory, a former World War I ace pilot, is the owner of a travelling carnival that has fallen on hard times. Only the money brought in by Craig McCoy, the carnival stunt pilot, keeps the carnival from closing. Jean Gregory, Colonel Gregory's daughter, works with Craig as a wing walker and parachutist.

A mysterious pilot, the legendary "Eagle", thought to have been shot down by accident by his own squadron and killed in the war, attempts to sabotage the Evans Aero Co., a large corporation. He sends threatening messages to the company's five directors by skywriting the date that the "Eagle" was shot down: May 23, 1918. Gregory is thought to be the Eagle because he has a grudge against Evans Aero, which stole his plans for a radio-piloted aircraft. Suspicion also falls on McCoy, who is also skilled in skywriting, and had left the message about the "Eagle" after being paid by an anonymous source.

Craig suspects that the "Eagle" is Mr. Green, a director of the corporation, a pilot who flew in the same squadron as the "Eagle", and the likely culprit who stole the plans to Gregory's invention. When confronted, Green escapes and teams up with two compatriots, Tim Moore and Boyle, but Craig grabs the plans and rushes back to the carnival to show Jean.

Gregory, who is confined to a wheelchair, tries to hide from the authorities. Someone steels Craig's aircraft and tries to burn down the carnival. Hoping to prove her father's innocence, the pair then learn of Gregory's disappearance, captured by the henchmen of the "Eagle". A murder occurs at the corporation and Gregory is again implicated.

Jean still thinks that her father is innocent and with Craig, escapes death on many occasions, fighting with gang members, as they go after the real "Eagle". Craig enlist the aid of the carnival's midget, strongman, and ventriloquist to track down the criminal. Craig unmasks the evildoer (Green) and brings the ordeal to an end.

Cast

John Wayne as Craig McCoy
Edward Hearn as Colonel Nathan B. Gregory
Dorothy Gulliver as Jean Gregory, Colonel Gregory's daughter
Richard Tucker as Major Evans, company owner
Ivan Linow as Heinie, the carnival strongman
James Bradbury Jr. as Henry, the carnival ventriloquist
Ernie Adams as Frederick "Pat" Kelly, the carnival barker
Billy West as Bob the Clown 
Lloyd Whitlock as Green, a director
Walter Miller as Danby, a director
Edmund Burns as Clark, a director
Pat O'Malley as Ames, a director
Kenneth Harlan as Ward, a director
"Little Billy" Rhodes as the Midget
Roy D'Arcy as Gardner
Bud Osborne as Tim Moore
Yakima Canutt as Boyle  
Monte Montague as Policeman Callahan
Murdock MacQuarrie as Frank the Watchman (uncredited)

Chapter titles

 The Carnival Mystery
 Pinholes
 The Eagle Strikes
 The Man of a Million Voices
 The Telephone Cipher
 The Code of the Carnival
 Eagle or Vulture?
 On the Spot
 When Thieves Fall Out
 The Man Who Knew
 The Eagle's Wings
 The Shadow Unmasked
Source:

Production
During the 1930s, after starring in The Big Trail (1930), its subsequent commercial failure meant that Wayne was relegated to minor roles in A-pictures, or starring, with his name over the title, in many low-budget Poverty Row Westerns, mostly at Monogram Pictures and serials for Mascot Pictures Corporation, such as The Shadow of the Eagle.

The Shadow of the Eagle was cheaply staged and relied heavily on studio sets for interior sequences, although much of the carnival scenes are shot outdoors. Although one of the "poverty row" studios, Mascot was important to Wayne's career and he went on to make two more serials for the studio. In The Shadow of the Eagle, Wayne does most of his own stunt work, which solidified him as a bona fide action star. As the carnival stunt pilot, a Travel Air 2000, commonly known as the "Wichita Fokker", was a popular aircraft used in Hollywood features.

Reception
Although concentrating on the aviation aspects of the production, aviation film historian James M. Farmer in Celluloid Wings: The Impact of Movies on Aviation (1984), characterized The Shadow of the Eagle as a lightweight formula melodrama.

Like many other serials, The Shadow of the Eagle was re-edited into a feature film version when it was released in home video form. The chapter screen titles were eliminated to create a more continuous flow.

See also
 John Wayne filmography
 List of American films of 1932
 List of film serials
 List of film serials by studio
 List of films in the public domain in the United States

References

Notes

Citations

Bibliography

 Cline, William C. "Filmography"., In the Nick of Time. Jefferson, North Carolina: McFarland & Company, Inc., 1984, .
 Clooney, Nick. The Movies That Changed Us: Reflections on the Screen. New York: Atria Books, 2002. .
 Farmer, James H. Celluloid Wings: The Impact of Movies on Aviation (1st ed.). Blue Ridge Summit, Pennsylvania: TAB Books 1984. .
 Rainey, Buck. Serials and Series: A World Filmography, 1912–1956. Jefferson, North Carolina: McFarland & Company, Inc., 2010. . 
 Weiss, Ken and Ed Goodgold. To be Continued ...: A Complete Guide to Motion Picture Serials. New York: Bonanza Books, 1973. .

External links

Download or view online
Full serial on Internet Archive

1932 films
American aviation films
American black-and-white films
American detective films
1930s English-language films
Mascot Pictures film serials
Films directed by B. Reeves Eason
Films directed by Ford Beebe
Films produced by Nat Levine
1930s American films